The Park Hill School District encompasses most of southern Platte County, Missouri, in the Northland region of the Kansas City Metropolitan Area. There are eight cities and towns that are partly or entirely within the district boundaries, including Parkville, Riverside, Weatherby Lake, Platte Woods, Lake Waukomis, Houston Lake, Northmoor and Kansas City, Missouri. The district serves almost 12,000 students and has about 73 square miles of area.

Schools
High Schools:
 Park Hill High School
 Park Hill South High School

Alternative High School:
 L.E.A.D Innovation Studio

Middle Schools:
 Congress Middle School
 Lakeview Middle School
 Plaza Middle School
 Walden Middle School

Elementary Schools:
 Chinn Elementary School
 English Landing Elementary School
 Graden Elementary School
 Hawthorn Elementary School
 Hopewell Elementary School
 Line Creek Elementary School
 Prairie Point Elementary School
 Renner Elementary School
 Southeast Elementary School
 Tiffany Ridge Elementary School
 Union Chapel Elementary School

Preschool:
 Gerner Family Early Education Center

Special Education:
 Russell Jones Education Center

References

External links
 

School districts in Missouri
Education in Platte County, Missouri
Kansas City metropolitan area